European route E 97 is an A-class European Route in Ukraine, Russia, Georgia, and Turkey. It connects the North Black Sea region with the South Black Sea region along the eastern shores of the sea.

Route description 
The E97 starts in the Ukrainian city of Kherson and proceeds to the Georgian city of Poti, intersected by a number of European routes. From Khershon it proceeds along M17. The road soon passes into the territory of Crimea (annexed by Russia), where it runs from Dzhankoy – Feodosiya – Kerch, and is then interrupted by the Strait of Kerch. The road used the now discontinued Kerch Strait ferry line between Port Krym, Ukraine and Port Kavkaz, Russia, but in 2018 the Crimean Bridge opened connecting Crimea and Russia by road (A290).

In Russia, the E97 heads to Novorossiysk, along the M4 to Dzhubga and finally via the M27 motorway to resort city of Sochi, site of the 2014 Winter Olympics. Further south, the route proceeds through Georgia, passing through Sukhumi, Poti and Batumi before reaching the Turkish border. From there, it extends to Trabzon, Gümüşhane and Aşkale, where the E97 terminates. Between Trabzon and Poti, the E97 is concurrent with the easternmost segment of the European route E70.

Roads 

: Kherson - Kalanchak

 ( disputed territory) 
 (Russia call it 35A-001 and 35K-001): Krasnoperekopsk - Dzhankoy - Feodosia
: Feodosia - Kerch

Kerch Strait
 (Crimean Bridge) Kerch - Novorossiysk

: Novorossiysk - Dzhubga
: Dzhubga - Sochi

: (under  Abkhazia control)  Leselidze - Sokhumi - Gali
: Zugdidi - Senaki
: Senaki - Poti (Start of Concurrency of ) - Grigoleti - Batumi - Sarpi

: Sarp - Rize - Trabzon (End of Concurrency of )
: Trabzon - Gümüşhane 
: Gümüşhane - Bayburt
: Bayburt - Aşkale

References

External links 
 UN Economic Commission for Europe: Overall Map of E-road Network (2007)

97
E097
European routes in Ukraine
E97